Sauk County is a county in Wisconsin. It is named after a large village of the Sauk people. As of the 2020 census, the population was 65,763. Its county seat and largest city is Baraboo. The county was created in 1840 from Wisconsin Territory and organized in 1844. Sauk County comprises the Baraboo, WI Micropolitan Statistical Area and is included in the Madison metropolitan area.

History
Sauk County was a New England settlement. The original founders of Sauk County consisted entirely of settlers from New England as well as some from upstate New York who had parents who moved to that region from New England shortly after the American Revolution. These people were "Yankee" settlers, that is to say they were descended from the English Puritans who settled New England in the 1600s. While most of them came to Wisconsin directly from New England, there were many who came from upstate New York. These were people whose parents had moved from New England to upstate New York in the immediate aftermath of the American Revolution. They were part of a wave of New England farmers who headed west into what was then the wilds of the Northwest Territory during the early 1800s. In the case of Wisconsin this migration primarily occurred in the 1830s. Due to the prevalence of New Englanders and New England transplants from upstate New York, Wisconsin was very culturally continuous with early New England culture for much of its early history.

The Yankee migration to Wisconsin in the 1830s was a result of several factors, one of which was the overpopulation of New England. The old stock Yankee population had large families, often bearing up to ten children in one household. Most people were expected to have their own piece of land to farm, and due to the massive and nonstop population boom, land in New England became scarce as every son claimed his own farmstead. As a result there was not enough land for every family to have a self-sustaining farm, and Yankee settlers began leaving New England for the Midwestern United States.

They were aided in this effort by the construction and completion of the Erie Canal which made traveling to the region much easier, causing an additional surge in migrants coming from New England. Added to this was the end of the Black Hawk War, which made the region much safer to travel through and settle in for white settlers.

They got to what is now Sauk County in the 1830s by sailing up the Wisconsin River from the Mississippi River on small barges which they constructed themselves out of materials obtained from the surrounding woodlands. When they arrived in what is now Sauk County there was nothing but dense virgin forest, the "Yankee" New Englanders laid out farms, constructed roads, erected government buildings and established post routes. They brought with them many of their Yankee New England values, such as a passion for education, establishing many schools as well as staunch support for abolitionism. They were mostly members of the Congregationalist Church though some were Episcopalian. Due to the second Great Awakening some of them had converted to Methodism and some became Baptist before moving to what is now Sauk County. Sauk County, like much of Wisconsin, would be culturally very continuous with early New England culture for most of its early history.

In the late 1890s, German immigrants began to settle in Sauk County, making up less than one out of thirty settlers in the county before this date. Generally there was little conflict between them and the "Yankee" settlers, however when conflict did arise it focused around the issue of prohibition of alcohol. On this issue the Yankees were divided and the Germans almost unanimously were opposed to it, tipping the balance in favor of opposition to prohibition. Later the two communities would be divided on the issue of World War I in which, once again, the Yankee community would be divided and the Germans were unanimously opposed to American entry into the war. The Yankee community was generally pro-British, however many of the Yankees also did not want America to enter the war themselves. The Germans were sympathetic to Germany and did not want the United States to enter into a war against Germany, but the Germans were not anti-British. Prior to World War I, many German community leaders in Wisconsin spoke openly and enthusiastically about how much better America was than Germany, due primarily (in their eyes) to the presence of English law and the English political culture the Americans had inherited from the colonial era, which they contrasted with the turmoil and oppression in Germany which they had so recently fled. In the early 1900s immigrants from Ireland, Sweden, Norway and Poland also arrived in Sauk County.
The area around Baraboo was first settled by Abe Wood in 1838, and was originally known as the village of Adams. In 1846 it became the county seat of Sauk County after a fierce fight with the nearby village of Reedsburg. In 1852, the village was renamed "Baraboo", after the nearby river. It was incorporated as a city in 1882.

New England settlers set up several sawmills early in the history of what is now Baraboo because of its location near the Baraboo and Wisconsin Rivers.

The city was the home of the Ringling Brothers. From 1884 to 1917 it was the headquarters of their circus and several others, leading to the nickname "Circus City". Today Circus World Museum is located in Baraboo. A living history museum, it has a collection of circus wagons and other circus artifacts. It also has the largest library of circus information in the United States. The museum previously hosted the Great Circus Parade, which carried circus wagons and performers through the streets of Baraboo, across the state by train, and then through downtown Milwaukee.

The Al. Ringling Theatre is a grand scale movie palace in downtown Baraboo, made possible through the financial assistance of the Ringling family. The Al Ringling home still exists.

Located near Baraboo is the Badger Army Ammunition Plant, which was the largest munitions factory in the world during World War II, when it was known as "Badger Ordnance Works". The plant is no longer in use.

The Culver's restaurant franchise has its headquarters in Prairie du Sac, and was first opened in Sauk City in 1984. That same year, Cirrus Aircraft, now of Duluth, Minnesota, was founded in a rural Baraboo barn by brothers Alan and Dale Klapmeier to produce the VK-30 kit aircraft.

Geography

Pewits Nest is located in Sauk County. Sauk Point is the county's highest point.

Major highways

  Interstate 90
  Interstate 94
  U.S. Highway 12
  U.S. Highway 14
  Highway 16
  Highway 23
  Highway 33
  Highway 58
  Highway 60
  Highway 78
  Highway 113
  Highway 123
  Highway 130
  Highway 136
  Highway 154
  Highway 159

Railroads
Canadian Pacific
Wisconsin and Southern Railroad

Buses
List of intercity bus stops in Wisconsin

Airports
Baraboo-Wisconsin Dells Airport (KDLL) serves the county and surrounding communities.
Tri-County Regional Airport (KLNR)
Sauk–Prairie Airport (91C)
Reedsburg Municipal Airport (C35)

Adjacent counties
Juneau County - north
Adams County - northeast
Columbia County - east
Dane County - southeast
Iowa County - south
Richland County - west
Vernon County - northwest

Demographics

2020 census
As of the census of 2020, the population was 65,763. The racial makeup of the county was 89.1% White, 1.3% Native American, 0.9% Black or African American, 0.6% Asian, 3.1% from other races, and 4.9% from two or more races. Ethnically, the population was 6.2% Hispanic or Latino of any race.

2000 census
As of the census of 2000, there were 55,225 people, 21,644 households, and 14,869 families residing in the county. The population density was 66 people per square mile (25/km2). There were 24,297 housing units at an average density of 29 per square mile (11/km2). The racial makeup of the county was 97.37% White, 0.26% Black or African American, 0.87% Native American, 0.26% Asian, 0.02% Pacific Islander, 0.59% from other races, and 0.64% from two or more races. 1.70% of the population were Hispanic or Latino of any race. 50.7% were of German, 8.5% Irish, 6.5% Norwegian, 6.2% American and 5.9% English ancestry. 95.5% spoke English, 1.9% Spanish and 1.4% German as their first language. There were 21,644 households, out of which 32.60% had children under the age of 18 living with them, 56.80% were married couples living together, 8.10% had a female householder with no husband present, and 31.30% were non-families. 25.20% of all households were made up of individuals, and 10.60% had someone living alone who was 65 years of age or older. The average household size was 2.51 and the average family size was 3.03.

In the county, the population was spread out, with 26.00% under the age of 18, 7.40% from 18 to 24, 29.30% from 25 to 44, 22.80% from 45 to 64, and 14.50% who were 65 years of age or older. The median age was 37 years. For every 100 females, there were 97.70 males. For every 100 females age 18 and over, there were 95.20 males.

Communities

Cities
 Baraboo (county seat)
 Reedsburg
 Wisconsin Dells (mostly in Columbia County, Adams County and Juneau County)

Villages

 Cazenovia (part)
 Ironton
 La Valle
 Lake Delton
 Lime Ridge
 Loganville
 Merrimac
 North Freedom
 Plain
 Prairie du Sac
 Rock Springs
 Sauk City
 Spring Green
 West Baraboo

Towns

 Baraboo
 Bear Creek
 Dellona
 Delton
 Excelsior
 Fairfield
 Franklin
 Freedom
 Greenfield
 Honey Creek
 Ironton
 La Valle
 Merrimac
 Prairie du Sac
 Reedsburg
 Spring Green
 Sumpter
 Troy
 Washington
 Westfield
 Winfield
 Woodland

Census-designated places
 Bluffview
 Lake Wisconsin (partial)

Other unincorporated communities

 Black Hawk
 Cassell
 Crawford Crossing
 Dellwood
 Denzer
 Greens Corners
 Hill Point
 La Rue
 Leland
 Loddes Mill
 Loreta
 Moon Valley
 Sandusky
 Valton
 Witwen

Politics
Sauk County voted for Republicans in all but five elections prior to 1992, thereafter trending Democratic. In 2016 Donald Trump won the county by 109 votes, but in 2020 it flipped blue once again. Since 1992 the county has voted for the statewide winner in every election, and is thus considered a bellwether politically.

Economy
The county's largest employer is the Ho-Chunk Nation, which employs roughly 3100 people combined in Jackson and Sauk counties.

See also
 A Sand County Almanac
 Badger Army Ammunition Plant
 Devil's Lake State Park (Wisconsin)
 National Register of Historic Places listings in Sauk County, Wisconsin
 Sauk Prairie, Wisconsin

References

Further reading
 Bohn, Belle Cushman. "Hop Culture in Early Sauk County". Wisconsin Magazine of History, vol. 18, no. 4 (June 1935), pp. 389–394.
 Canfield, William H. Guide Book to the Wild and Romantic Scenery in Sauk County, Wisconsin. Baraboo: Republic Book, 1873.
 Canfield, William H. Outline Sketches of Sauk County, Wisconsin : including its History from the First Marks of Man's Hand to 1861 and its Topography. vol. 1, 1874; vol. 2, 1896.
 Cole, Harry Ellsworth (ed.). A Standard History of Sauk County, Wisconsin. 2 vols. Chicago: Lewis Publishing Co., 1918.
 Eiseley, Jane and William H. Tishler. "The Honey Creek Swiss Settlement in Sauk County: An Expression of Cultural Norms in Rural Wisconsin". Wisconsin Magazine of History, vol. 73, no. 1 (Autumn 1989), pp. 2–20
 The History of Sauk County, Wisconsin. Chicago: Western Historical Company, 1880.
 Lange, Kenneth I. A County Called Sauk: A Human History of Sauk County, Wisconsin. Stevens Point, Wis: Worzalla Pub. Co., 1976.
 Memorial and Biographical Record and Illustrated Compendium of Biography ... of Columbia, Sauk and Adams counties, Wisconsin.... Chicago. Geo. A. Ogle, 1891.
 Moore, Robert J. "The Civilian Conservation Corps in Sauk County: Devil's Lake and LaValle". Wisconsin Magazine of History, vol. 95, no. 1 (Autumn 2011), pp. 2–15.

External links
 Sauk County website
 Sauk County map from the Wisconsin Department of Transportation
 Sauk County Health and Demographic Data

 
Madison, Wisconsin, metropolitan statistical area
1844 establishments in Wisconsin Territory
Populated places established in 1844